Semeia was a journal published by the Society of Biblical Literature, "devoted to the exploration of new and emergent areas and methods of biblical criticism."

Semeia Studies 
After 2002, the journal Semeia was replaced by the book series Semeia Studies.

References

Publications established in 1972
Publications disestablished in 2002
Academic journals published by learned and professional societies
Christianity studies journals